Kibber, also Kibber Khas and Khyipur, is a village high in the Spiti Valley in the Himalayas at  in Himachal Pradesh in northern India. It contains a monastery and is a base for visiting the Kibber Wildlife Sanctuary. Agriculture forms the backbone of the local economy and lush green fields are abundant. It is the base for visitors to the Kibber Wildlife Sanctuary, home to about 30 snow leopards. Treks to neaby peaks and to a high pass in the Zanskar range between Spiti and Ladakh start from Kibber.

History
Kibber is the last village in Spiti on the traditional trade route to Ladakh and Tibet. One of the earliest descriptions is by botanist Thomson based on his expedition in September 1847. It then descends along the Pare Chu (river) to Hanle and the Indus River. Thomson observed that houses in Kibber were constructed of stone, unlike the mud construction used in the rest of Spiti.

In earlier times, annual trade fairs were held in Kibber and other locations in Spiti.  Traders would come from Tibet, Ladakh, Chamba and Kullu to barter their wares.  With the closing of the Indo-Tibet border, these fairs have lost their historical purpose.

Geography
Kibber Khas is located on a limestone cliff on the left bank of the Spiti River. After passing the Kye Monastery, the road from Kaza climbs steeply up a narrow gorge on the left bank of the Puri Lungpa, a tributary of the Spiti, to reach Kibber. It is one of the highest villages in the world that is inhabited year round.

The terrain slopes gently upwards from Kibber towards the northeast until the towering Zanskar Range.  The streams in the area have cut deep gorges in the limestone strata.  Mountain ranges on all sides provide some protection, and water from the streams is useful for irrigation.  Farmers in Kibber are able to grow crops during the summer.

Demographics and amenities
Kibber Khas is a small village located in Spiti sub-division of Lahul and Spiti district, Himachal Pradesh with total 77 families residing. The Kibber Khas village has a population of 366 of which 187 are males while 179 are females as per Population Census 2011.

In Kibber Khas village, the population of children of age 0-6 is 36 which makes up 9.84% of the total population of village. The average Sex Ratio of Kibber Khas village is 957 which is lower than Himachal Pradesh state average of 972. Child Sex Ratio for the Kibber Khas as per census is 565, lower than the Himachal Pradesh average of 909.  Kibber Khas village has lower literacy rate compared to Himachal Pradesh.  In 2011, the literacy rate of Kibber Khas village was 72.73% compared to 82.80% of Himachal Pradesh.  In Kibber Khas, male literacy stood at 82.93% while female literacy rate was 62.65%.

Kibber has a civil dispensary, a high school, a post office, a telegraph office and a community TV set.

Administration

The Gram Panchayat of Kibber or Kibber Gram Panchayat is a government office and local self-government body that governs the villages of Kibber Khas, Kee, Chicham, Gete and Tashigang.  Kibber is located in the Development Block Spiti of the District Lahaul Spiti.

Economy
Traditionally, agriculture has been the mainstay of the economy.  As the men were often traveling on trade to Tibet, Punjab and other parts of India, the women did the agricultural work primarily for subsistence.  As Kibber is the base for several treks and for visits to the Kibber Wildlife Sanctuary, tourism is now part of the economy.  Several homestays have been setup, and locals guide treks.

Agriculture
Barley was ready for harvest. Hugh Whistler, ornithologist, visited Kibber in July 1922 and observed barley and green peas in the fields.

This amounted to 83.7% of the  area of the village. Only 11.3% of the land was used for agriculture, with 85.3% of this being irrigated. Barley and pulses including black peas and green peas are the major crops. With the opening of roads, there is a shift to cash crops.

Places of interest

Monasteries 
Kibber has a small gompa. The well-known Kye Gompa is en route from Kaza to Kibber.

Trekking and mountaineering 
Kibber is a base for climbing the nearby  Kanamo Peak.  The name Kanamo means either "mountain of good omen" or "white hostess (lady)".  The trek is rated as an "easy ridge walk with scree on the lower slopes" by Indian mountaineer Harish Kapadia.  The trek from Kibber takes 2-3 days.  The season for this trek is late June to the end of September.
The trail over the  Parang La to Ladakh starts from Kibber. This strenuous trek takes about 5 days to cross the Parang La and another 5 days to descend to Karzok on the shore of Tso Moriri in Ladakh.

Kibber Wildlife Sanctuary

Flora 
The most common shrub is Caragana versicolor, a slow-growing, woody dwarf shrub with multiple stems forming a low canopy. He attributed this to the extreme aridity of the climate and the protection afforded to the Kibber area by the lofty mountain ranges on all sides.

In a recent study, over 70 species of plants were identified in this sanctuary, compared to about 9,000 species in the whole of the Himalayas.  Several plants used in the traditional Tibetan medical system, also known as Sowa-Rigpa, are found here.  Eight rare and endangered medicinal plant species have been identified in this sanctuary. Aconitum rotundifolium, Arnebia euchroma, Ephedra gerardiana, Gentiana kurroo and Dactylorhiza hatagirea are some threatened but medicinally important plants found in here.

Mammals 
The Kibber Wildlife Sanctuary (Kibber WLS) is home to the endangered snow leopard (Panthera uncia).  The Forest Department of Himachal Pradesh reported 25-30 snow leopards in the Kibber Wildlife Sanctuary in 2018.  A survey in 2021 estimated the total population of snow leopards in Himachal at about 73. 

Conservation of snow leopards is a priority.  The Himalayan Snow Leopard Research Centre in Kibber village was setup in collaboration with the Nature Conservation Foundation, Mysore with the goal of instituting and encouraging focused short and long-term studies.  Snow leopard sighting tours are popular in winter.  These result in noise and pollution of many vehicles.  In 2021, the Spiti district administration banned such car rallies in Kibber and other areas favoured by snow leopards.   The majority of snow leopards in Himachal were found outside protected areas, indicating that the local people are active in conservation of these big cats.

Other big animals found in the Wildlife Sanctuary are bharal (Psedois nayaur), ibex (Capra sibirica) Himalayan wolf (Canis lupus chanco) and red fox (Vulpes vulpes).  The bharal and ibex are prey for snow leopards.

Birds

Owing to the sparse vegetation and the extreme winters, fewer birds are found in Spiti compared to the lower Himalayas and the plains of India. In July 1922, the English police officer and ornithologist Hugh Whistler made a short trip from Lahaul down the upper Spiti River. He reached Kibber (Kibar) and Kye Monastery before turning back. During his trip, he collected over 30 species of birds. Of these, about 20 were from Kibber and the area above (now the Kibber WLS). Species collected by Whistler around Kibber included a number of songbirds: several rosefinches, mountain finches and snow finches, redstarts, larks, wrens, house sparrows and martins. Larger birds included a kestrel, lammergeier and ruddy shelducks. Alpine choughs were common. 

Most of the species reported by Whistler were also observed by the American zoologist Walter Koelz during his trip down the Spiti river in September 1933.  Koelz did not explore the Kibber locality, though.

The eBird.org website, used by birding enthusiasts to record sightings, lists 64 species sighted in Kibber village over the past several years.  The most frequently seen species:  yellow-billed or alpine chough and red-billed chough; snow finches, mountain finches; house sparrow and russet sparrow; black redstart and white-capped redstart; snow pigeon and hill pigeon;  horned lark; Himalayan griffon.  Most of the species observed 100 years ago by Whistler are in these eBird checklists.

Transport
A bus service connects them during the summer months. Travellers coming from Manali or Lahaul on NH-505 over the Kunzum La can reach Kibber without going to Kaza. After passing Losar and Hanle, NH-505 crosses a bridge from the left bank of the Spiti River  after Kialto village.

Accommodation
Kibber has several homestays.  The nearest hotels are in Kaza.

Gallery

See also
 Snow leopard
 Key Monastery
 Pin Valley National Park
 Spiti

References

External links 
Wikimapia

Buddhist monasteries in Himachal Pradesh
Villages in Lahaul and Spiti district